Shoaib Khan (born 6 December 1992) is a cricketer who plays for the Oman cricket team. In September 2021, he was named in Oman's One Day International (ODI) squad for round six and round seven of the 2019–2023 ICC Cricket World Cup League 2. He made his ODI debut on 14 September 2021, for Oman against Nepal.

In February 2022, he was named in Oman's Twenty20 International (T20I) squad for the 2021–22 Oman Quadrangular Series. He made his T20I debut on 11 February 2022, for Oman against Nepal. In March 2022, in the fifth match of the 2022 United Arab Emirates Tri-Nation Series, Khan scored his first century in ODI cricket, with 105 not out.

References

External links
 

1992 births
Living people
Omani cricketers
Oman One Day International cricketers
Oman Twenty20 International cricketers
Pakistani expatriates in Oman
Place of birth missing (living people)